Milberg LLP (formerly known as Milberg Weiss LLP and Milberg Weiss Bershad & Schulman LLP) is a US plaintiffs' law firm, established in 1965 and based in New York City. It has mounted many class action cases on behalf of investors, and has been recognized as among the leading firms in its field by the National Law Journal, RiskMetrics Group, Securities Class Action Services, and Law360. The firm and some of its partners were charged in 2006 with offering improper inducements to plaintiffs. The case against the firm itself was dismissed in 2008, but that same year four partners pleaded guilty to charges, and many others had already left the firm.

In 2018, Milberg merged with Sanders Philips Grossman, a mass tort firm known for its class action lawsuits against pharmaceutical companies, to form Milberg Tadler Phillips Grossman. In 2019, former partner Steven Schulman sued the firm, claiming the merger was an attempt to circumvent the firm's debts to him.

Founding and history
Melvyn Weiss convinced his partner, Lawrence Milberg, to fund class-action securities litigation against Dolly Madison Industries. Dolly Madison acquired at least 30 companies over an 18-month period. Dolly Madison was allegedly facilitating these deals by falsifying its balance sheet to artificially increase its stock price. Weiss and Milberg thought they could win a large payout from Dolly Madison's accounting firm, Touche Ross and Co., a "big eight" firm in the 1960s. Like most defendants in class actions, Dolly Madison delayed as long as possible and the case did not go to trial until 1973. Shortly before a verdict was rendered Touche settled for $2 million, resulting in a $500,000 fee for Milberg.

Before its split in May 2004 with the firm now known as Robbins Geller Rudman & Dowd LLP, it was the largest plaintiff law firm in the United States, with over 200 attorneys, responsible, at least in part, for over 50 percent of all securities class action cases settled in 2002.

Notable cases

Milberg was co-lead counsel in a securities fraud class action case against French conglomerate Vivendi. After nearly eight years of litigation, the case was tried to a jury for three months in late 2009, and resulted in a verdict for plaintiffs in January 2010. The jury found Vivendi liable for 57 false or misleading class period statements. Even with claimants who made foreign purchases removed from the class after the Supreme Court's Morrison v. National Australia Bank Ltd decision, total damages claims exceeded $1 billion.

On August 24, 2011, the U.S. District Court for the Southern District of New York approved a $180 million settlement to resolve antitrust claims brought by a class of consumers, represented by Milberg, against Sirius XM Radio. The case stems from the 2008 merger between Sirius Satellite Radio, Inc. and XM Satellite Holdings, Inc. that created Sirius XM, now the nation's only satellite radio company. The plaintiffs alleged that the merger of the only two U.S. satellite radio providers was an illegal move to eliminate competition and monopolize the satellite radio market.

Milberg represented a healthcare worker in a whistleblower suit against his former employer Medline Industries, Inc., along with its charitable arm, The Medline Foundation. The Firm negotiated an $85 million settlement on behalf of the federal government, announced on March 11, 2011. The suit was filed under the False Claims Act ("FCA"), which allows private citizens to sue companies that are defrauding the government and to receive an award for their efforts when the case is successful. Although a party to the settlement agreement, the U.S. Department of Justice chose not to intervene in the lawsuit. Milberg pursued the case and obtained one of the largest settlements of an FCA case in which the government declined to intervene.

In 2010, Milberg won a victory before the United States Supreme Court, which issued a decision (Merck & Co., Inc. v. Reynolds) addressing when an investor is placed on "inquiry notice" of securities fraud violation sufficient to trigger the statute of limitations under 28 U.S.C. § 1658(b).

Other milestones in the Firm's history include its involvement in the "US Financial" litigation in the early 1970s, one of the earliest large class actions, which resulted in the $50 million recovery for purchasers of the securities of a failed real estate development company; Other cases included the Ninth Circuit decision in Blackie v. Barrack in 1975, which established the fraud-on-the-market doctrine for securities fraud actions; the Firm's co-lead counsel position in the In re Washington Public Power Supply System (WPPSS) Securities Litigation, a seminal securities fraud action in the 1980s in terms of complexity and amounts recovered; the representation of the Federal Deposit Insurance Corp. in a year-long trial to recover banking losses from a major accounting firm, leading to a precedent-setting global settlement; attacking the Drexel-Milken "daisy chain" of illicit junk-bond financing arrangements with numerous cases that resulted in substantial recoveries for investors; and representing life insurance policyholders defrauded by "vanishing premium" and other improper sales tactics and obtaining large recoveries from industry participants.  Milberg's attorneys also argued another important case in 2007 before the high court in Tellabs Inc. v. Makor Issues & Rights Ltd.

Recoveries

Recognition and rankings

In 2009, 2010 and 2011, The National Law Journal included Milberg in its "Plaintiffs' Hot List."

Criminal charges

On May 18, 2006, the firm and two of its named partners, David J. Bershad and Steven G. Schulman (Schulman resigned in December 2006), were indicted by a grand jury in the United States District Court for the Central District of California on various counts, including racketeering, mail fraud, and bribery.  The charges included claims that Milberg Weiss paid portions of its legal fees to plaintiffs in order to induce them to sue.  By January 2007, more than half of the firm's partners had left the firm.  As of June 2008, the firm's website lists only 53 full-time attorneys (29 partners and 24 associates).

On June 16, 2008, U.S. prosecutors in Los Angeles dismissed the indictment against the firm, under a non-prosecution agreement, and a statement by the government that "no attorney currently a partner or associate with Milberg LLP is criminally culpable" with respect to conduct charged in the indictment. Milberg agreed to pay $75 million to settle the charges.

However, four longtime Milberg Weiss partners pleaded guilty to federal charges, including Steven Schulman, David Bershad, William Lerach, and Melvyn Weiss.  Melvyn Weiss pleaded guilty in exchange for an 18- to 33-month prison sentence and fines and restitution of $10 million.  Lerach was sentenced to two years in federal prison, two years' probation, fined $250,000 and ordered to complete 1,000 hours of community service.  Bershad paid $250,000 in fines and forfeited $7.75 million. Bershad was sentenced to six months of incarceration in October 2008.  
Weiss was sentenced to 30 months of incarceration on Monday June 2, 2008.  He was released  in February 2010.  Bershad was released from custody on July 2, 2009, and Schulman was released on July 10, 2009.  Lerach was released on March 8, 2010.

See also
 Lexecon Inc. v. Milberg Weiss Bershad Hynes & Lerach
 Mauldin v. Wal-Mart Stores, Inc.

References

External links
Milberg firm homepage

Law firms based in New York City
Law firms established in 1965
Corporate scandals